Julia Stewart or Stuart may refer to:

Julia Stewart (businesswoman) (born 1955), American businesswoman
Julia Stewart (actress) (1862–1945), English stage actress
Julia Stuart, English novelist and journalist
Julia Stuart (c.1867–1949), English-born American actress of the silent film era; credits include Saved from the Titanic